Anna Karapetyan (born 20 June 1990) is an Armenian footballer who plays as a goalkeeper for FC Alashkert. She has been a member of the Armenia women's national team.

See also
List of Armenia women's international footballers

References

External links

 

1990 births
Living people
Women's association football goalkeepers
Armenian women's footballers
Footballers from Yerevan
Armenia women's international footballers
WFC Naftokhimik Kalush players
Russian Women's Football Championship players
Kubanochka Krasnodar players
FC Alashkert players
Armenian expatriate footballers
Armenian expatriate sportspeople in Ukraine
Expatriate women's footballers in Ukraine
Armenian expatriate sportspeople in Russia
Expatriate women's footballers in Russia